P. carnea may refer to:

 Palaeaspilates carnea, a geometer moth
 Peachia carnea, a sea anemone
 Peniophora carnea, a wood-decay fungus
 Phlox carnea, a flowering plant
 Phytometra carnea, an owlet moth
 Pinna carnea, a bivalve mollusc
 Pitcairnia carnea, a flowering plant
 Prodioxys carnea, an Israeli bee
 Pseudosimnia carnea, a sea snail
 Pseudothyretes carnea, a wooly bear
 Pyura carnea, a sessile ascidian